Antonio Sapienza (18 June 1794 – 1855) was an Italian composer and conductor. He was born in St. Petersburg, Russia where he began his musical studies with his father who was also called Antonio. (Antonio Sapienza Sr. (1755–1829) had emigrated from Naples to Russia in 1783 and served as a musician and voice teacher at the Russian imperial court.)

At the age of 28, Sapienza left Russia for Naples to continue his musical studies at the conservatory there with Giacomo Tritto, Niccolò Antonio Zingarelli and Pietro Generali, during which time he composed two Masses, several motets and a Salve regina. He remained in Italy for six years and composed three operas for the Neapolitan theatres which were well-received in their day. According to the Allgemeine musikalische Zeitung, he was also one of the several composers who produced the dramatic cantata, La fondazione di Partenope, performed at the Teatro San Carlo on 12 January 1824 to celebrate the birthday of King Ferdinand I of the Two Sicilies.

Sapienza returned to St. Petersburg in 1828 where he served as choirmaster and conductor at the Imperial Theatre until his death in 1855.

Operas
Rodrigo (opera seria); Librettist: Giovanni Federico Schmidt; Premiere: Teatro San Carlo. Naples,  28 August 1823 (also performed at La Scala, Milan under the title Gonzalvo during the 1825/26 Carnival season)
L'audacia fortunata (opera buffa); Librettist: Jacopo Ferretti; Premiere: Teatro del Fondo, Naples, summer 1824
Tamerlano (dramma per musica); Librettist: Andrea Leone Tottola; Premiere:  Teatro San Carlo, Naples, 27 November 1824
Ivan Tsarevich; Librettist: unknown; Premiere: St. Petersburg, 1830

References

External links
Works by Antonio Sapienza held in Italian libraries
Manuscript score of Sapienza's opera Roderigo digitized by the library of the Conservatorio San Pietro a Majella

1794 births
1855 deaths
19th-century classical composers
Italian classical composers
Italian male classical composers
Italian opera composers
Male opera composers
19th-century Italian composers
19th-century Italian male musicians